O Corpo Sutil (The Subtle Body) is the debut solo album by musician Arto Lindsay, released in 1996.

Reception
William Ruhlmann for AllMusic gave the album 3/5 stars, noting the change of direction Lindsay had taken from his days of leading noise rock bands like DNA, and called it "a charming, restrained record, not the kind of adjectives generally used to describe Lindsay's music before now". In his book Grown Up All Wrong - 75 Great Rock and Pop Artists from Vaudeville to Techno, Robert Christgau praised the albums lyrics and called it, "quiet and traditional-sounding - a formal translation of what samba means to Lusophones like Lindsay, for whom it’s a music not just of entrancing groove but of world-class poetry".

Track listing
All tracks composed by Arto Lindsay and Vinicius Cantuária; except where indicated
"4 Skies" (Lindsay, Amadeo Pace)
"Child Prodigy" (Lindsay, Caetano Veloso)
"Anima Animale" (Lindsay, Towa Tei, Vinicius Cantuária)
"Esta Seu Olhar" (Antônio Carlos Jobim)
"My Mind is Going" (Joey Baron, Bill Frisell)
"Enxugar" 
"No Meu Soutague"
"Unbearable"
"Nobody in Bed" (Lindsay, Bill Frisell)
"Astronauts"
"Sovereign" (Lindsay, Ryuichi Sakamoto)

References

1996 debut albums
Rykodisc albums
Arto Lindsay albums